Aporia hippia is a butterfly of the family Pieridae. It is found in the Amur region, Ussuri, Korea, and Japan.

The wingspan is 30–42 mm.

The larvae feed on Berberis species, including Berberis amurensis and Berberis thunbergi.

Subspecies
Aporia hippia hippia
Aporia hippia occidentalis (Transbaikalia)
Aporia hippia japonica (Japan)
Aporia hippia taupingi
Aporia hippia thibetana

External links
encyber.com

Aporia (butterfly)
Butterflies described in 1861
Butterflies of Asia
Taxa named by Otto Vasilievich Bremer